The China Zebrafish Resource Center (CZRC) is a non-profit organization  located in 7 Donghu South Road, Wuhan, Focusing mainly on zebrafish resources. It was established in the Institute of Hydrobiology, Chinese Academy of Sciences, in October 2012, currently headed by the Board Chairman Meng Anming.

Introduction
CZRC is a non-profit organization jointly supported by the Ministry of Science and Technology of China, and the Chinese Academy of Sciences.  CZRC mainly focuses on collecting the existing zebrafish resources, developing new lines and technology, with the purpose to provide resource, technical and informatic support for Chinese and overseas colleagues.

Board of directors
Honorary Board Chairman: Zhu Zuoyan

Board Chairman: Meng Anming

Board Secretary-General and Director: Sun Yonghua

References

Danios
Animal models
Stem cell research
Regenerative biomedicine
Chinese Academy of Sciences
Organizations based in Wuhan